Egituysky datsan is a Buddhist temple in Buryatia, Russia located in Yeravninsky  District.

The datsan is kept sacred world of Buddhism – Buddha Sandalwood (Zandan Zhuu) – which is by tradition the only lifetime statue of Buddha is kept Shakyamuni. V datsan world Buddhist shrine – Sandalwood Buddha (Zandan Zhuu) – which is by tradition the only lifetime sculpture of Buddha Shakyamuni.

History 

The monastery was founded in 1820.

The architecture of Egituysky datsan was one of the most beautiful. Three Dugan – medical, philosophical and astrological – surrounded by the main temple. When datsan operated printing press.

In 1937 Egituysky datsan was closed and destroyed.

Datsan revived after 1991.

Sources 
Эгитуйский дацан
Эгитуйский дацан и статуя Зандан Жуу.
Мы в СМИ

Buddhism in Buryatia
Buddhism in the Soviet Union
Buildings and structures built in the Soviet Union
Buddhist monasteries in Russia
Gelug monasteries
Buildings and structures in Buryatia